Eduardo García de Enterría y Martínez-Carande (27 April 1923 – 16 September 2013) was a Spanish jurist and a major contributor to the research and teaching of Public Law in Spain. In 1984, he was awarded the Prince of Asturias Award for Social Sciences for his "important research and teaching work".

Born in Ramales de la Victoria, province of Santander (current Cantabria), he studied law at the Universities of Barcelona and Madrid, where he obtained his Doctoral Degree, cum laude. Later, he continued his studies at the Universities of London and Jena.

In 1947, he became a lawyer for the Spanish Council of State, later obtaining the chair of Administrative Law at the University of Valladolid (1957). He joined the law faculty at the Complutense University of Madrid in 1962 where, from 1970, he was the head of the department. From 1988 he was Professor Emeritus at the Free College of University Emeriti in Madrid.

He was the first Spanish judge on the European Court of Human Rights in Strassbourg, where he served from April, 1978 to February, 1986. He also presided over the Fédération International pour le Droit Européen (FIDE); founded and presided over the Spanish Association for the Study of European Law, and took part in the Academic Council of the European Law Research Center at Harvard Law School.

He co-founded and was the first Vice-President of the "World Society of Friends of Jorge Luis Borges" and the "International Can Mossenya Foundation - Friends of J. L. Borges" In 1974, he established the Revista Española de Derecho Administrativo and was its director until his death. He was also on the editorial staff of several other Spanish periodicals and journals, as well as the Yearbook of European Law and the European Review of Public Law.

His law office in Madrid has helped to develop the procedures for creating and registering NGOs. He also participated in several commissions formed to draft Spanish laws; including the Spanish Constitution of 1978.

Honors

Academic positions
From 1970, he was an Academic Numerary at the Royal Academy of Jurisprudence and Legislation and, from 1984, at the Royal Spanish Academy. In 2004, he became a member of the Accademia Nazionale dei Lincei. He also held the position of Doctor Honoris Causa at over a dozen universities in Spain and Latin-America, as well as at the Sorbonne.

Awards
 Prince of Asturias Award for Social Sciences (1984)
 Alexis de Tocqueville Prize of the European Institute for Public Administration (1999)
 Cristóbal Gabarrón Foundation Award for Lifetime Achievement (2005)
 Menéndez Pelayo International Prize (2006)

Selected works
  La Constitución como Norma y el Tribunal Constitucional, Civitas (1981) 
 Fervor de Borges, Trotta (1999) 
 De Montañas y Hombres, Austral (2001) 
 La Batalla por las Medidas Cautelares, Civitas (2004) 
 Revolución Francesa y Administración Contemporánea, Civitas (2005) 
 La Administración Española, Alianza (2005) 
  La Lengua de los Derechos, Alianza (2007) 
 Las Transformaciones de la Justicia Administrativa, Civitas (2007) 
 Hamlet en Nueva York: Autores, Obras, Paisajes, La Esfera de los Libros (2008) 
  Democracia, Jueces y Control de la Administración, Civitas (2009)

References

External links
 Direito do Estado, Depoimentos Magistrais: Interview with Eduardo García de Enterría  
 El País: Archive of articles by Eduardo García de Enterría
García de Enterría law firm

1923 births
2013 deaths
Judges of the European Court of Human Rights
20th-century Spanish judges
Academic staff of the University of Valladolid
Academic staff of the Complutense University of Madrid
Members of the Royal Spanish Academy
Spanish judges of international courts and tribunals
Harvard Law School alumni